"Le Chant des Africains" (The Song of the Africans) is the unofficial anthem of the Pied-noir community in France and its former colonies in Africa.

History

World War I
Originally written in 1914 by a Sergeant-Major Bendifallah and companyman Marizot, Le Chant des Africains is a testimony to the bravery of a Moroccan goumier regiment disbanded after suffering severe losses in Meaux, northeast of Paris. The song became popular among the soldiery as well as civilians, but was not set to music until 1918 by Félix Boyer, bandmaster of the Algerian Garrison.

World War II

The lyrics were modified in 1943 to include all Africans who identified as Frenchmen or Pieds-noirs, especially those from the Arab world. Also changed were references to location, as most singers had returned to the colonies. Ironically, this situation has again reversed itself in the meantime. This 1943 version was dedicated to Lt.Col. van Hecke's :fr:7e régiment de chasseurs d'Afrique who fought the 1944-45 Italian, French and German Allied military campaigns.

Algerian War
The song was reportedly being used by the Europeans supporting the status quo of French Algeria against its independence supported by president Charles de Gaulle. Because of that the song was forbidden from the French military until it was authorized again, in 1969.

Today
Le Chant des Africains remains today an adopted symbol of identity for the Pied-noir community.

Lyrics

Below are the lyrics of the first stanza and refrain of the 1914 and 1944 versions.

External links
 FCNV.com - Le Chant des Africains lyrics and music
 Anciens Combattants d'Algérie article with both versions of Le Chant des Africains (in French)
 Blog article about the song's pertinence today (in French)

French songs
French military marches
French anthems
Songs about Africa